Ukhrul/Hunphun (Meitei pronunciation:/ˈuːkˌɹəl or ˈuːkˌɹʊl/) is a town in the state of Manipur, India. Ukhrul is the home of the Tangkhul Nagas. It is the administrative headquarter of the Ukhrul district. There are also four sub-divisions in the district for administering the villages in and around it. The villages, however, are governed by the 'village heads'.

Geography
It has a wet summer and cold, dry winter.

Politics
There have been two Ukhrul chief ministers (Yangmaso Shaiza and Rishang Keishing), as well as other leaders such as Rungsung Suisa and Thuingaleng Muivah. Ukhrul is part of Outer Manipur.

Notes

References 

 
Cities and towns in Ukhrul district